The Labour Party of Iran (Toufan) is a Hoxhaist Communist party whose leadership is exiled in Germany. It is against the Iranian government and is a member of the International Conference of Marxist-Leninist Parties and Organizations (Unity & Struggle).

History
The original party was founded in 1965 after a split within Tudeh over concerns of reformism, calling itself the Revolutionary Tudeh Party. It was later renamed the Marxist-Leninist Organization Toufan ("Toufan" meaning Storm.) It aligned with the People's Socialist Republic of Albania following the Sino-Albanian split.

Hamid Reza Chitgar (known as Hamid Bahmani) was the representative of the Labor Party of Iran in the 1980s during his exile, until he was assassinated by regime agents in May 1987. He was lured from his exile in France for a meeting in Austria and was found assassinated two months later in an abandoned apartment in Vienna.

References

External links
Website

Banned political parties in Iran
International Conference of Marxist–Leninist Parties and Organizations (Unity & Struggle)
Communist parties in Iran
Political parties established in 1965
Hoxhaist parties
Labour parties
Stalinist parties
Anti-revisionist organizations
Iranian organizations based in Germany
Banned communist parties